The Bankers Football Club was an Australian rules football club, formed on 28 March 1877 in Adelaide from about 30 officers of the Banks of Adelaide, that played in the inaugural 1877 SAFA season. 

The club lost every one of the 15 matches it contested, finishing 8th and collecting the SAFA first wooden spoon, whilst scoring just 4 goals and conceding 36; six of these losses were on forfeit as the club struggled to field a team.

Members of Bankers were invited to join the Adelaide Club for scratch match on 28 April prior to the start of the season.

The club's first official match was on Saturday 12 May 1877 vs Adelaide on the Adelaide Oval. Messr Colton as Captain. Their only goal was kicked by Lindsay in a 1-4 defeat. The match was advertised for the week before on Saturday 5 May for a 2.30pm start but was postponed due to the weather. Bankers were to wear White jerseys.

Tragedy struck the Club when one of its players C.B.(Charles) Poole died on 5 June after suffering an injury in the club's second game against South Park on 19 May. There was ensuring debate as a consequent about the rule of when a player was collared with the ball. 

Its last recorded game was on Saturday, 28 July 1877 vs South Park. Mr Crooks as Captain in a 0-3 goals defeat.

It was reported that the Banker's forfeited their game on 11 August 1877 vs Port Adelaide at Montefiore Hill. Port had a full team on the field when the Banker's Captain Mr Cotton informed them that his team would not be present.

It was seen by fans, the media and other teams as being equal to a social club at the elite level: at the end of the 1877 season, ‘Marlborough’, writing in The Advertiser, implicitly echoed these sentiments regarding the Bankers club, and expressed the hope "that no efforts will be made to establish it next season". 

The writer got his wish, as the Bankers dropped out of the SAFA and disbanded never to be seen again.

References

Former South Australian National Football League clubs
Australian rules football clubs in South Australia
Australian rules football clubs established in 1877
Australian rules football clubs disestablished in 1877
1877 establishments in Australia
1877 disestablishments in Australia